BBX Capital Corporation (NYSE: BBX, OTCQX: BBXTB), formerly BFC Financial Corporation, is a diversified holding company whose principal holding is Bluegreen Corporation. BBX Capital Corporation chief activity is the acquisition, ownership, and management of real estate and real estate development projects and middle market operating businesses. As of March 1, 2017, their subsidiary companies and divisions include Bluegreen Corporation, Hoffman's Chocolates, Renin Corp., and BBX Sweet Holdings.

Executive Management Team 

 Alan B. Levan: Chairman and CEO of BBX Capital Corporation
 Jarett S. Levan: President, BBX Capital Corporation
 John E. Abdo: Vice Chairman of BBX Capital Corporation
 Seth M. Wise: Executive Vice President, BBX Capital President, BBX Capital Real Estate
 Ray. S. Lopez: Executive Vice President, BBX Capital Chief Financial Officer, BBX Capital Corporation
 Shawn B. Pearson: CEO and President of BBX Capital Corporation, Bluegreen Corporation

References

1966 establishments in Florida
Holding companies of the United States
Companies based in Boca Raton, Florida
American companies established in 1966